Azerbaijan is a country in the Caucasus.

Azerbaijan or Azərbaycan may also refer to:
 Azerbaijan (newspaper), a state-owned newspaper of Azerbaijan
 Azerbaijan Soviet Socialist Republic, part of the former Soviet Union (1936–1991)
 Azerbaijan Democratic Republic, a short-lived state (1918–1920)
 Azerbaijan (Iran), a region in northwestern Iran
 Azerbaijan People's Government, a short-lived autonomous state in Iran (1945–46)
 Günəşli, Lerik, formerly known as Azərbaycan, a village in Azerbaijan

See also 
 Azer (disambiguation)
 Azerbaijani (disambiguation)
 Azeri (disambiguation)